"It's Working" is a song recorded by Canadian country group James Barker Band. Barker co-wrote the song with Gavin Slate and Travis Wood. It was the fourth single from the band's debut extended play Game On.

Critical reception
Sara Netemeyer of Country Fancast stated in response to the track: "there is no doubt these guys know how to write a catchy song".

Commercial performance
"It's Working" reached a peak of number three on the Billboard Canada Country chart, marking four consecutive top ten hits to open the band's radio career. It has been certified Gold by Music Canada.

Music video
The official music video was for "It's Working" premiered on August 23, 2017, and was directed by Pedro Rosa. The video features footage from the band's live performances and backstage content, in addition to a cameo appearance by Dean Brody on his "Beautiful Freakshow" Tour.

Charts

Certifications

References

2017 songs
2017 singles
James Barker Band songs
Songs written by James Barker (singer)
Songs written by Gavin Slate
Songs written by Travis Wood (songwriter)
Song recordings produced by Todd Clark
Universal Music Canada singles